Missa L'homme armé sexti toni is probably the latter of two L'homme arme masses by Josquin des Prez, both published in 1502. "sexti toni" refers to the use of the sixth Gregorian mode. It uses Paraphrase technique in which the L'homme armé tune is shared between all voices rather than being confined to a single one, as in Josquin's tenor mass  (Missa L'homme armé super voces musicales). The five sections of the mass contain several examples of compositional virtuosity, including strict canons in the Sanctus/Osanna and simultaneous statements of the theme both forwards and in retrograde in the final Agnus Dei.

References
Noble, Jeremy (1972), sleeve notes to his recording with The Josquin Choir

Masses by Josquin des Prez
Renaissance music